Pattakkarai is a small village situated near Nazareth in the Thoothukudi District of Tamil Nadu, India. It is located on the road from Nazareth, which is 4 km away, to Tiruchendur. There are about 150 families in this village who live in more than 200 houses. It belongs to the Kachanavilai panchayat.

Facilities in Pattakkarai include a C.S.I church (Holy Immanuel Church) and a post office. The majority of the population is Christian. Their business is fishing, gardening and cultivation. The main community is the Nadar caste which belongs to the Ruban community from Israel. Every year, people celebrate the church inauguration day on 17 May. The next day, people donate food for poor people from the church.

References

http://wikimapia.org/11788280/PATTAKKARAI

http://holyindia.org/temple/pattakkarai/pattakkarai_full_moon_calendar

Villages in Thoothukudi district